The Roman Catholic Diocese of Kalay is a diocese of the Catholic Church in Burma. It was established by Pope Benedict XVI on 22 May 2010 by bifurcating the Diocese of Hakha and is suffragan to the Archdiocese of Mandalay.

Kalay diocese is located in the northwestern part of Myanmar (Burma), bordering India, covering some part of the Chin State and part of Sagaing Division. It is bounded by the diocese of Myitkyina on the Northeast, Mandalay on the East and Hakha on the South. There are 22 parishes grouped into 4 vicariates or zones namely – Kalay, Khampat, Tiddim and Tonzang. It is mainly inhabited by the Zomi ethnic groups who are also known as Chin.

See also
Catholic Church in Burma

References

External links
 Catholic Hierarchy 
 GCatholic.org
 Catholic Bishops' Conference of Myanmar
 UCAN directory 

Kalay
Christian organizations established in 2010
Roman Catholic dioceses and prelatures established in the 21st century
2010 establishments in Myanmar